Shankavar (also Romanized as Shānkāvar; also known as Shangāvar) is a village in Khoshabar Rural District, in the Central District of Rezvanshahr County, Gilan Province, Iran. At the 2006 census, its population was 910, in 233 families.

References 

Populated places in Rezvanshahr County